The  (NIRS) is a radiation research institute in Japan. The NIRS was established in 1957 as the Japan's only one institute of radiology. The NIRS maintains various ion accelerators in order to study the effects of radiation of the human body and medical uses of radiation.

The National Institute of Radiological Sciences hospital established in 1961 is a research hospital with a basic focus on radiation therapy. In 1993 the HIMAC (Heavy Ion Medical Accelerator in Chiba) of NIRS was launched, and in 1997 the Research Center for Charged Particle Therapy was opened as one of the leading medical centers using carbon ions are in operation.

On April 1, 2016, the Japan Atomic Energy Agency (JAEA) transferred some of its laboratories to the NIRS, and the NIRS body was renamed to the National Institutes for Quantum and Radiological Science and Technology (QST) which includes existing laboratories of the NIRS; the NIRS is currently a radiological research division of the QST.

Organizational structure
 Auditing and Compliance Office (Headquarters)
 Department of Planning and Management
 Department of General Affairs
 Research, Development and Support Center
 Research Center for Charged Particle Therapy
 Hospital
 Molecular Imaging Center
 Research Center for Radiation Protection
 Research Center for Radiation Emergency Medicine
 Radiation Emergency Medical Assistance Team
 Center for Human Resources Development
 International Open Laboratory
 Medical Exposure Research Project
 Fukushima Project Headquarters

Notes

External links
NIRS official website (in English and Japanese)

Independent Administrative Institutions of Japan
1957 establishments in Japan
International research institutes
Nuclear research institutes
Medical research institutes in Japan
Biological research institutes
Nuclear medicine organizations